Nguyễn Thị Hương is a Vietnamese boxer.

She won a medal at the 2019 AIBA Women's World Boxing Championships.

References

Living people
AIBA Women's World Boxing Championships medalists
Vietnamese women boxers
Light-heavyweight boxers
Year of birth missing (living people)
21st-century Vietnamese women